The Church of St. Agnes is a parish church in the Roman Catholic Archdiocese of New York, located at 143 East 43rd Street, Manhattan, New York City. The parish was established in 1873.

Parish
The parish was intended to serve Italian laborers of Grand Central Terminal and Depot. Rev. Harry Cummings Macdowell, nephew of Father Jeremiah Cummings of St. Stephen's, was the first pastor, assisted by Rev. A. Catoggio. The parish was organized on July 13, 1873. Macdowell had rented a hall over Croton Market on 42nd Street as a temporary chapel and passed out handbills to announce the fact to the local Catholic residents.

A Sunday school was begun on 43rd Street. The parish school, located at 152 East 44th Street, was organized in 1893. 

The church hosted Archbishop Fulton J. Sheen's radio and television broadcasts on behalf of the Society for the Propagation of the Faith for over half a century. The broadcasts, including the famous "Death of Stalin," were some of the most important influences in reshaping mainstream twentieth-century American attitudes on Catholicism. Other notable clergy have included Bishop John J. O'Hara, Monsignor John P. Chidwick, Monsignor Eugene V. Clark, and Father George W. Rutler. As an important venue for media, and with its proximity to the center of New York City, the church often played host to rallies, such as the starting point for John Cardinal O'Connor's anti-abortion march from this church.

Buildings
The church was built 1873–1877 to the designs of Lawrence J. O'Connor. Builders were Moran and Armstrong and Michael J. Newman. The basement was completed and used as a chapel which was dedicated by John Cardinal McCloskey on January 11, 1874. A Celtic cross crowned the gable. The sanctuary contained a chancel window depicting St. Agnes. The completed church was dedicated by Cardinal McCloskey on May 6, 1877. 

The parish constructed a four-story brick and stone rectory and sacristy in 1904 to designs by Jeremiah O'Rourke & Sons of 756 Broad Street, Newark, New Jersey for $31,000.

The church has suffered two fires. The first, which badly damaged it but left the towers standing, occurred on December 24, 1898.  The following February, plans were filed to rebuild it and add a semi-octagonal chancel to the rear, at the expected total cost of $40,000. The second fire, in 1992, left only the outside walls and the towers standing.  The church was rebuilt to designs by the firm Acheson, Thorton, Doyle, and opened in 1998. The new church was modeled after the Church of the Gesù in Rome, but had the original church's towers from O'Connor's church flanking the new building.

The altar triptych in the rebuilt church was painted by Sean Delonas.

References

External links
Church of Saint Agnes Website
Catholic Blog Spot

Roman Catholic churches completed in 1877
19th-century Roman Catholic church buildings in the United States
Roman Catholic churches completed in 1998
Demolished churches in New York City
Demolished buildings and structures in Manhattan
Building and structure fires in New York City
Church fires in the United States
Religious organizations established in 1873
Roman Catholic churches in Manhattan
Gothic Revival church buildings in New York City
Baroque Revival architecture in New York City
Midtown Manhattan
Turtle Bay, Manhattan
1873 establishments in New York (state)